Paul Claude Marie Touvier (3 April 1915 – 17 July 1996) was a French Nazi collaborator during World War II in Occupied France. In 1994, he became the first Frenchman ever convicted of crimes against humanity, for his participation in the Holocaust under Vichy France.

Early life 
Paul Claude Marie Touvier was born on 3 April 1915 in Saint-Vincent-sur-Jabron, Alpes de Haute-Provence, in southeastern France. His family was devoutly Roman Catholic, lower-middle-class and extremely conservative. He was one of 11 children, and the oldest of the five boys. He served as an altar boy when he was young, and attended a seminary for a year, intending to become a priest.

Touvier's mother, Eugenie, was an orphan who was raised by nuns. As an adult, she was very religious and went to Mass every day. She died when Touvier was an adolescent. His father, François Touvier, was a tax collector in Chambéry, after having retired after serving as a career soldier for 19 years. Touvier's father was very conservative, an admirer of the monarchist and anti-parliamentarist Charles Maurras and L'Action Française.

Paul Touvier graduated from the Institute  Saint Francis de Sales in Chambéry at the age of 16. When he turned 21, his father got him a job as a clerk at the local railroad station, where he was working when World War II began. Touvier was mobilized for the war effort in 1939. After the Vichy government was created, Touvier and his family were firm supporters of its leader Philippe Pétain. Father and son joined the Vichy veterans' group when it was founded in 1941.

 War years 

Joining the French Army's 8th Infantry Division, Touvier fought against the German Wehrmacht until, following the bombing of Chateau-Thierry, he deserted. Touvier returned to Chambéry in 1940, which was then occupied by the Kingdom of Italy. His life took a new course after the Milice (the Vichy French militia) was established.

Touvier had become known for womanizing and for trading in the black market. Disgusted by his son's libertine lifestyle, his devoutly Catholic father persuaded him to join the Milice, hoping that a little military discipline would "make a man out of his son."

Touvier was eventually appointed head of the intelligence department in the Chambéry Milice under the direction of the German SS official, Klaus Barbie. In January 1944 he became its second regional head.

In Paris on 28 June 1944, 15 members of the Résistance, dressed as members of the Milice, assassinated Vichy France Minister for Propaganda Philippe Henriot as he slept in the Ministry building where he lived and worked.  As it was suspected that the assassins were from Lyon, Touvier was ordered to conduct reprisal killings. On 30 June, Touvier found seven French Jewish prisoners already in custody, and had them executed by firing squad.

 Post liberation 

After the liberation of France by the Allied forces, Touvier went into hiding; he escaped the summary execution suffered by many suspected collaborators during the epuration sauvage. On 10 September 1946, the government sentenced him to death in absentia for treason and collusion with the Nazis. In 1947, he was arrested for armed robbery in Paris, but escaped.

 Fugitive 

By 1966, implementation of his death sentence was barred based on a 20-year statute of limitations. Following this, attorneys for Touvier filed an application for a pardon.  They requested that the lifetime ban on leaving the country and the confiscation of goods linked to capital punishment be lifted. In 1971, French President Georges Pompidou granted Touvier the pardon.

Pompidou's pardon caused a public outcry.  This increased when it was revealed that most of the property which Touvier claimed as his own had allegedly been seized from deported Jews.

On 3 July 1973, Georges Glaeser filed a complaint against Touvier in the Lyon Court, charging him with crimes against humanity. There was no statute of limitations on such charges. Glaeser accused Touvier of ordering the execution of seven Jewish hostages at Rillieux-la-Pape near Lyon, on 29 June 1944. This was in retaliation for the murder of Philippe Henriot, the Vichy Government's Secretary of State for Information and Propaganda, which had occurred the previous evening. After being indicted, Touvier disappeared again. Years of legal maneuvering ensued through his lawyers until a warrant was issued for his arrest on 27 November 1981.

 Arrest and trial 
On 24 May 1989, Touvier was arrested at the Society of Saint Pius X (SSPX) Priory in Nice. The SSPX said at the time that Touvier had been allowed to live in the Priory as "an act of charity to a homeless man".

 Death 

On 17 July 1996, Paul Touvier died of prostate cancer at the age of 81 in Fresnes Prison, near Paris. A Tridentine Requiem Mass was offered for the repose of his soul by Father Philippe Laguérie at St Nicolas du Chardonnet, the Society of St. Pius X chapel, in Paris. He was survived by his widow, Monique (died 2018), and their two children, Chantal and Pierre.

 In popular culture 
The Irish-Canadian novelist Brian Moore's 1995 novel, The Statement, is loosely based on Touvier's life. It was adapted as a film, also titled The Statement (2003), directed by Norman Jewison. Michael Caine appeared as Pierre Brossard, a character inspired by Touvier.

The 1989 efforts by French authorities to find and arrest Touvier are documented in an episode of the History Television series, Nazi Hunters, first broadcast on 1 November 2010.

 Brel connection 
For several years, the Belgian singer Jacques Brel worked with Touvier. Touvier met Brel by reportedly approaching him in a restaurant and saying, "I am Paul Touvier, a condemned man." Brel's wife, however, said that they knew him only as "Paul Berthet", an alias which he sometimes used, based on his wife's maiden name.

 See also 
Maurice Papon

 References 

Further reading 
 Brian Busby, Character Parts: Who's Really Who in CanLit'' (2003). .

External links 
 Simon Kitson, "Bousquet, Touvier and Papon: Three Vichy personalities"  University of Portsmouth French History Interview series
 Resistance and Deportation History Centre 

1915 births
1996 deaths
Deaths from cancer in France
Deaths from prostate cancer
French collaborators with Nazi Germany
French military personnel of World War II
French people convicted of crimes against humanity
French people who died in prison custody
French police officers convicted of murder
French prisoners sentenced to life imprisonment
French traditionalist Catholics
People convicted of treason against France
People from Alpes-de-Haute-Provence
People sentenced to death in absentia
Prisoners sentenced to life imprisonment by France
Prisoners who died in French detention
People convicted of murder by France
Recipients of French presidential pardons
War crimes in France